The Battle of the Border is the name of the athletics rivalry between the Cardinals and Lady Cardinals of Lamar University and Cowboys and Cowgirls of McNeese State University (athletically branded as "McNeese" since the 2015–16 school year). Originally in football, the rivalry now covers all sports. In 2009, the rivalry was expanded to include "...head-to-head and SLC [Southland Conference] Championship competition in 14 different sports...". The competition is a joint agreement with the two universities and sponsor, Verizon Wireless

Background
Both universities are public universities in their respective states. Lamar University, located in Beaumont, Texas, is part of the Texas State University System, and McNeese State University, located in Lake Charles, Louisiana, is part of the University of Louisiana System. Lamar and McNeese are about 60 miles apart, accessible via Interstate 10.

Football

After the 1989 season, Lamar shut down its football program, before resurrecting it for the 2010 season. The Lamar–McNeese rivalry resumed in 2010.

Game results
Through the 2022 season, McNeese holds a 28–11–1 edge in the all-time series after 40 games.

Men's basketball
As of the end of the 2020–21 season, Lamar has a 61–49 lead in men's basketball games against McNeese.

Women's basketball
As of the end of the 2020–21 season, McNeese has a 44–36 series lead in women's basketball over Lamar.

Baseball
As of the end of the 2021 season, Lamar has a 122–83–2 lead over McNeese.

Soccer
As of the end of the 2021 season, Lamar has a 7–6 lead over McNeese.  Each school sports 3 match winning streaks.  McNeese won the first 3 matches.

Softball
As of the end of the 2021 season, McNeese has a 31–7 lead over Lamar

See also 
 List of NCAA college football rivalry games

References

College baseball rivalries in the United States
College basketball rivalries in the United States
College football rivalries in the United States
Lamar Cardinals and Lady Cardinals
McNeese Cowboys and Cowgirls